Gymnocarpium robertianum, the limestone fern or scented oakfern, is a fern of the family Cystopteridaceae.

Description
Gymnocarpium robertianum has small (10–50 cm), deltate, two- to three-pinnate fronds. Fronds arise from creeping rhizomes and have long, delicate rachis. The sori are borne in round clumps on the underside of the blade and lack an indusium. This species differs from the closely related G. dryopteris in having a densely glandular rachis as well as a more sparsely glandular underside to the blade.

Gymnocarpium robertianum is thought to hybridise with G. appalachianum giving rise to Gymnocarpium × heterosporum W. H. Wagner. This hybrid was only known from Pennsylvania where it has now been eradicated. The hybrid between G. robertianum and G. dryopteris is called Gymnocarpium × achriosporum Sarvela. This taxon is known from Sweden and Quebec.

Distribution and habitat
Gymnocarpium robertianum is a circumboreal species with populations in Europe, North America and the Caucasus Mountains.

This species is protected in Illinois and Michigan  and is protected under the Flora Protection Order in Ireland.

This species is a calcicole and as such is restricted to alkaline rich areas. In the British Isles its preferential habitat is grykes in limestone pavement. In Michigan the species is most frequent in Thuja occidentalis swamps.

References

External links
Gymnocarpium robertianum at Flora of North America 
Distribution of Gymnocarpium robertianum in the British Isles at BSBI maps 
Gymnocarpium robertianum at Hardy Fern Library 

robertianum
Ferns of the United States
Taxa named by Edward Newman
Flora of Canada